The 2021 UEFA Nations League final was a football match that determined the winners of the final tournament of the 2020–21 UEFA Nations League. It was the second final of the international football competition involving the men's national teams of the member associations of UEFA. The match was held on 10 October 2021 at the San Siro in Milan, Italy, and was contested by Spain and France.

France won the match 2–1 for their first UEFA Nations League title.

Venue
The final was played at the San Siro in Milan, home to Milan and Inter Milan.

Background

Route to the final

Note: In all results below, the score of the finalist is given first (H: home; A: away).

Pre-match

Officials

On 8 October 2021, the UEFA Referees Committee announced the officiating team for the final, led by 42-year-old English referee Anthony Taylor of the Football Association. He was joined by seven of his compatriots, including assistant referees Gary Beswick and Adam Nunn. Craig Pawson served as the fourth official, while Stuart Burt was selected as the reserve assistant referee. At UEFA headquarters in Nyon, Switzerland, Stuart Attwell worked as the video assistant referee (VAR) for the match. Chris Kavanagh and Lee Betts were appointed as assistant VAR officials, along with Dutchman Pol van Boekel.

Taylor has been a FIFA referee since 2013. The match was his third UEFA final as lead referee, having officiated the 2015 UEFA European Under-19 Championship final and the 2020 UEFA Super Cup. He also was selected as a referee at UEFA Euro 2020, where he officiated three matches. He previously served as an additional assistant referee at UEFA Euro 2016, including the final, as well as in the 2015 UEFA Europa League final and 2016 UEFA Champions League Final. Domestically, he officiated the FA Cup final in 2017 and 2020, the Football League Cup final in 2015, and the FA Community Shield in 2015. The final was the fourth time Taylor had refereed Spain (two wins and one loss) and the third for France (one win and one loss).

Team selection
Spain had all their players available for selection. However, Ferran Torres was a doubt with an ankle issue which required him to be substituted out of Spain's semi-final against Italy and miss Spain's final training session. France had two players missing, after left-back Lucas Digne left the squad due to a muscle injury, while midfielder Adrien Rabiot testing positive for SARS‑CoV‑2.

Both teams made two changes to their starting line-ups after their semi-final victories. Spain replaced centre-back Pau Torres with Eric García and midfielder Koke with Rodri, while France replaced centre-back Lucas Hernandez with Presnel Kimpembe and COVID-positive Rabiot with Aurélien Tchouaméni.

Match

Summary
After a goalless first half, Mikel Oyarzabal put Spain into the lead after 64 minutes with a low finish from the left to the bottom right corner of the net after a pass from Sergio Busquets which French defender Dayot Upamecano failed to cut out.
This goal came seconds after Theo Hernandez shot against the underside of the crossbar for France. Two minutes later Karim Benzema scored to make it 1–1, cutting in from the left to the edge of the penalty area before shooting to the top right corner of the net past Unai Simón who managed to get a touch on the ball but could not prevent it going into the net.
With ten minutes remaining Kylian Mbappé got the winning goal when he received the ball from Theo Hernandez before shooting low under the advancing goalkeeper Simón from the left. Mbappé was initially in an offside position from the pass but as the ball was deflected into his path by Eric García he became onside and so the goal was given.

Details

Statistics

Notes

References

External links

Final
2021
2021–22 in Italian football
Spain national football team matches
2021–22 in Spanish football
France national football team matches
2021–22 in French football
Sports competitions in Milan
Football in Milan
2020s in Milan
October 2021 sports events in Italy